Wulong (meaning "dancing dragon") is a genus of microraptorine dromaeosaurid dinosaurs from the Early Cretaceous (Aptian) Jiufotang Formation of China. It includes one species, Wulong bohaiensis. The skeletal remains represent a juvenile.

Discovery 
The holotype specimen of the dinosaur, D2933, was found by a farmer in the fossil-rich Jiufotang Formation of Liaoning Province, China. Since then the fossil skeleton has been housed in the collection of the Dalian Natural History Museum in Liaoning. The skeletal bones were analyzed by Ashley William Poust who named them as Wulong bohaiensis in a thesis in 2014. This name for the time being remained an invalid nomen ex dissertatione. In 2020, Poust alongside his former advisor David Varricchio from Montana State University and Dalian paleontologists Gao Chunling, Wu Jianlin, and Zhang Fengjiao validly named and described the type species Wulong bohaiensis. The generic name is derived from Chinese 舞, wǔ, "dancing", in reference to the "individual's sprightly pose and inferred nimble habits", and 龍/龙, lóng, "dragon". The specific name refers to the museum being located at the Bohai Strait (渤海 or Bó Hǎi).

Description 
The long and bony tail of Wulong bohaiensis is double its body length. Its skeleton had hollow bones. The specimen includes feathers on its limbs and two long plumes at the end of its tail. In addition, it has a narrow head that carries thin jaws filled with small and sharp teeth. It is closely related to Sinornithosaurus from the Yixian Formation.

The long skull of Wulong is large in relation to the body. It is in 1.15 times the length of the femur. The lighty built premaxilla, one of a pair of small cranial bones at the very tip of the upper jaw, is relatively short dorsoventrally for a dromaeosaurid. 

The quadratojugal of most dromaeosaurids is T-shaped, but in Wulong this bone is tiny and L‐shaped. The ascending process of this theropod is about 6 mm tall, the jugal process is 5 mm long.

References 

Microraptorians
Early Cretaceous dinosaurs of Asia
Cretaceous China
Fossil taxa described in 2020
Jiufotang fauna